Count of Maceda is a hereditary title in the Peerage of Spain, accompanied by the dignity of Grandee and granted in 1654 by Philip IV to Alonso de Lanzós, Lord of Maceda and knight of the Order of Santiago.

The name makes reference to the town of Maceda in Galicia, Spain, where the 1st count held a fiefdom.

Counts of Maceda

Alonso de Lanzós Novoa y Andrade, 1st Count of Maceda
Bernardino de Lanzós Novoa y Andrade, 2nd Count of Maceda
Antonio de Lanzós Novoa y Andrade, 3rd Count of Maceda
José Benito de Lanzós Novoa y Sotomayor, 4th Count of Maceda
Antonio Pedro Nolasco de Lanzós y Taboada, 5th Count of Maceda
Baltasar de Lanzós y Taboada, 6th Count of Maceda
Francisco Javier de Lanzós y Taboada, 7th Count of Maceda
María de la Concepcion de Lanzós y Osorio, 8th Countess of Maceda
Gonzalo Manuel de Lanzós Deza y Lanzós, 9th Count of Maceda
Baltasar Pardo de Figueroa y Lanzós, 10th Count of Maceda
Ramona Pardo de Figueroa y Sarmiento, 11th Countess of Maceda
Francico Javier de Losada y Pardo de Figueroa, 12th Count of Maceda
José de Losada y Miranda, 13th Count of Maceda
Baltasar de Losada y Miranda, 14th Count of Maceda
Baltasar de Losada y Torres, 15th Count of Maceda
Beatriz Losada y Ozores, 16th Countess of Maceda
Lucía Casani y Losada, 17th Countess of Maceda
Inés Pan de Soraluce y Casani, 18th Countess of Maceda

See also
List of current Grandees of Spain

References

Counts of Spain
Grandees of Spain
Lists of counts
Lists of Spanish nobility
Noble titles created in 1654